Nikolai Nikolajevich Gerhard (Russian:Герард, Николай Николаевич, born 3 September 1838 in Mogilev Governorate - 9 December 1929 in Halila sanatorium in Polyany, Leningrad Oblast) was a Russian general and politician. He served as the Governor-General of Finland from 6 December 1905 to 2 February 1908.

References

|-

1838 births
1929 deaths
Governors of the Grand Duchy of Finland
People from Mogilev Region